The Lehman Orchard and Aqueduct were established by Absalom Lehman, the discoverer of Lehman Caves in what would become Great Basin National Park in eastern Nevada. Seven apricot trees and one peach tree remain. To irrigate the orchard, Lehman built a ditch from Lehman Creek  to the orchard, where it encircles the orchard. A branch above the orchard ran to a reservoir, now vanished,  that was used for ice, fishing and swimming. A portion of the aqueduct has been reconstructed. Both the orchard and the reconstructed portion of the ditch are near the National Park Service's Lehman Caves Visitor Center.

The orchard and aqueduct were placed on the National Register of Historic Places in 1975.

References

External links

 Lehman Aqueduct at Great Basin National Park
 Lehman Orchard at Great Basin National Park

Historic districts on the National Register of Historic Places in Nevada
National Register of Historic Places in Great Basin National Park